Johann Leopold may refer to,

 Johann Leopold, Hereditary Prince of Saxe-Coburg and Gotha (1906–1972), eldest son of Charles Edward, Duke of Saxe-Coburg and Gotha and Princess Victoria Adelaide of Schleswig-Holstein-Sonderburg-Glücksburg
 Johann Leopold Theodor Friedrich Zincken (1770–1856), German entomologist
 Johann Leopold Zillmann (1830–1892), German missionary to Australia
 Johann Georg Leopold von Versen (1791–1868), German military and nobleman
 Johann Leopold Abel (1795–1871), German pianist and composer

See also
 John Leopold (disambiguation)